The 2018–19 FIS Cross-Country Alpen Cup (OPA Cup) was a season of the Alpen Cup, a Continental Cup season in cross-country skiing for men and women. The season began on 21 December 2018 in Valdidentro, Italy and concluded on 17 March 2019 in Oberwiesenthal, Germany.

Calendar

Men

Women

Overall standings

Men's overall standings

Women's overall standings

References

External links
Men's Overall Standing at FIS
Women's Overall Standing at FIS

Alpen Cup
FIS Cross-Country Alpen Cup seasons
2018 in cross-country skiing
2019 in cross-country skiing